Rockland High School may refer to a school in the United States:

 Rockland High School (1909) - a former high school in Rockland, Massachusetts
 Rockland Senior High School - a current high school in Rockland, Massachusetts